Armand Ken Ella (born 23 February 1993) is a Cameroonian footballer who plays as a winger.

Club career
Ella is a product of the FC Barcelona Sportive Youth school. On 31 August 2012 he signed a contract with the Ukrainian football club FC Karpaty Lviv.

In March 2017 he returned to Ukraine and signed contract with FC Inhulets Petrove the Ukrainian First League.

International career
He played in 8 matches and scored 3 goals for Cameroon national under-20 football team.

References

External links
 
 
 

1993 births
Living people
Footballers from Douala
Cameroonian footballers
Cameroonian expatriate footballers
Association football wingers
FC Karpaty Lviv players
Kaposvári Rákóczi FC players
Sandecja Nowy Sącz players
Free State Stars F.C. players
FC Inhulets Petrove players
FC Inhulets-2 Petrove players
FK Mash'al Mubarek players
FC Bukovyna Chernivtsi players
Expatriate footballers in Ukraine
Cameroonian expatriate sportspeople in Ukraine
Expatriate footballers in Hungary
Cameroonian expatriate sportspeople in Hungary
Expatriate footballers in Poland
Cameroonian expatriate sportspeople in Poland
Expatriate soccer players in South Africa
Cameroonian expatriate sportspeople in South Africa
Expatriate footballers in Uzbekistan
Cameroonian expatriate sportspeople in Uzbekistan
Cameroon under-20 international footballers
Ukrainian Premier League players
Ukrainian First League players
Ukrainian Second League players
I liga players
South African Premier Division players
Uzbekistan Super League players
Cameroon youth international footballers